The Evangelical Church in Germany (abbreviated EKD) is a federation of twenty Lutheran, Reformed (Calvinist) and United (e.g. Prussian Union) Protestant regional churches and denominations in Germany, which collectively encompasses the vast majority of Protestants in that country. In 2020, the EKD had a membership of 20,236,000 members, or 24.3% of the German population. It constitutes one of the largest national Protestant bodies in the world. Church offices managing the federation are located in Hannover-Herrenhausen, Lower Saxony. Many of its members consider themselves Lutherans.

Historically, the first formal attempt to unify German Protestantism occurred during the Weimar Republic era in the form of the German Evangelical Church Confederation, which existed from 1922 until 1933. Earlier, there had been successful royal efforts at unity in various German states, beginning with Prussia and several minor German states (e.g. Duchy of Nassau) in 1817. These unions resulted in the first united and uniting churches, a new development within Protestantism which later spread to other parts of the world.

When Adolf Hitler came to power in 1933, his administration tried to reorganize the old confederation into a unified German Evangelical Church as Hitler wanted to use a single Protestant church to further his own ambitions. However, a division emerged between the Reichskirche, led by the pro-government German Christians, and the Confessing Church, which opposed state control of the church. Other Protestant churches aligned themselves with one of these groups, or stayed neutral in this church strife.

The postwar church council issued the Stuttgart Declaration of Guilt on 19 October 1945, confessing guilt and declaring remorse for indifference and inaction of German Protestants in the face of atrocities committed by Hitler's regime. In 1948, the Evangelical Church in Germany was organized in the aftermath of World War II to function as a new umbrella organization for German Protestant churches. As a result of tensions between West and East Germany, the regional churches in East Germany broke away from the EKD in 1969. In 1991, following German reunification, the East German churches rejoined the EKD.

The member churches (Gliedkirchen), while being independent and having their own theological and formal organisation, share full pulpit and altar fellowship, and are united in the EKD synod, but they act as individual members of the World Council of Churches (WCC) and the Community of Protestant Churches in Europe (CPCE). Boundaries of EKD churches within Germany partially resemble those of the states of the Holy Roman Empire and successor forms of German statehood (to the most part 1815 borders), due to the historically close relationship between individual German states and churches.

As for church governance, the Lutheran churches typically practise an episcopal polity, while the Reformed and the United ones a mixture of presbyterian and congregationalist polities. Most member churches are led by a (state) bishop. Only one member church, the Evangelical Reformed Church in Germany, is not restricted to a certain territory. In some ways, the other member churches resemble dioceses of the Roman Catholic and Anglican churches, from an organisational point of view.

Name
The German term  here more accurately corresponds to the broad English term Protestant rather than to the narrower evangelical (in German called ), although the Evangelical Lutheran Church in America, the Evangelical Lutheran Church in Canada and the Evangelical Lutheran Church of England use the term in the same way as the German church. Martin Luther encouraged the use of this term alongside Christian.

History

From the Peace of Augsburg in 1555 to the end of the First World War and the collapse of the German Empire, some Protestant churches were state churches. Each  (state or regional church) was the official church of one of the states of Germany, while the respective ruler was the church's formal head (e.g. the King of Prussia headed the Evangelical Church of Prussia's older Provinces as supreme governor), similar to the British monarch's role as the Supreme Governor of the Church of England.

This changed somewhat with growing religious freedom in the 19th century, especially in the republican states of Bremen, Frankfurt (1857), Lübeck, and Hamburg (1860). The greatest change came after the German Revolution, with the formation of the Weimar Republic and the abdication of the princes of the German states. The system of state churches disappeared with the Weimar Constitution (1919), which brought about disestablishment by the separation of church and state, and there was a desire for the Protestant churches to merge. In fact, a merger was permanently under discussion but never materialised due to strong regional self-confidence and traditions as well as the denominational fragmentation into Lutheran, Reformed, and United and uniting churches.

During the Revolution, when the old church governments lost power, the People's Church Union was formed and advocated unification without respect to theological tradition and also increasing input from laymen. However, the People's Church Union quickly split along territorial lines after the churches' relationship with the new governments improved.

It was realised that one mainstream Protestant church for all of Germany was impossible and that any union would need a federal model. The churches met in Dresden in 1919 and created a plan for federation, and this plan was adopted in 1921 at Stuttgart. Then in 1922 the then 28 territorially defined Protestant churches founded the German Evangelical Church Confederation (DEK). At the time, the federation was the largest Protestant church federation in Europe with around 40 million members. Because it was a federation of independent bodies, the Church Union's work was limited to foreign missions and relations with Protestant churches outside Germany, especially German Protestants in other countries.

In July 1933, the German Evangelical Church (DEK) was formed under the influence of the German Christians, a pro-Nazi religious movement. They had much influence over the decisions of the first National Synod, via their unambiguous partisanship in successfully backing Ludwig Müller for the office of Reich bishop. The Confessing Church arose in resistance to the Nazi regime's ideology. After the installation of Hanns Kerrl as minister for church matters in a Führer-directive of 16 July 1935 and the foundation of the – in the end not materialising – Protestant Reich Church, the DEK played more or less no further role.

In 1948, freed from the German Christians' influence, the Lutheran, Reformed and United churches came together as the Evangelical Church in Germany at the Conference of Eisenach. In 1969, the regional Protestant churches in East Germany and East Berlin broke away from the EKD and formed the League of Evangelical Churches in the German Democratic Republic (BEK), in 1970 also joined by the Moravian Herrnhut District. In June 1991, following German reunification, the BEK merged with the EKD.

While the members are no longer state churches, they enjoy constitutional protection as statutory corporations, and they are still called , and some have this term in their official names. A modern English translation, however, would be regional church. Apart from some minor changes, the territories of the member churches today reflect Germany's political organisation in the year 1848, with regional churches for states or provinces that often no longer exist or whose borders changed since. For example, between 1945 and 1948, the remaining six ecclesiastical provinces, each territorially comprising one of the Old Prussia provinces, within the Evangelical Church of the old-Prussian Union assumed independence as a consequence of the estrangement among them during the Nazi struggle of the churches. This turned the Evangelical Church of the old-Prussian Union into a mere umbrella, being itself a member of EKD (and the BEK, 1969–1991) but covering some regional church bodies, which were again themselves members of EKD (and the BEK, 1969–1991).

Since 1973, when many Protestant churches in Europe, including the EKD members, concluded the Leuenberg Agreement, also the then 21 EKD members introduced full communion for their parishioners and ministry among each other.

Since also the regional Protestant churches in East Germany had signed the Leuenberg Agreement, thus the then ten members of the Federation of Protestant Churches in the German Democratic Republic practised full communion with the EKD members too. Ordination of women is practised in all 20 member churches with many women having been ordained in recent years. There are also several women serving as bishops. Margot Käßmann, former bishop of the Evangelical Lutheran Church of Hanover and Chairperson of the Council of the EKD from 2009 until February 2010, was the first woman to head the EKD. Blessings of same-sex marriages is practised and allowed in 14 of 20 and Blessing of same-sex unions are allowed in all other member churches.
 The EKD opposes abortion in most situations but believes it should remain legal.

The EKD has undergone a split in the 20th century and lost a bulk of its adherents in East Germany due to state atheist policies of the former East German government. After 1990, membership was counted and amounted to around the same number as the Roman Catholic Church. In the 21st century, membership in both the Evangelical Church and the Roman Catholic Church stagnates as more people are becoming religious nones.

Membership

Protestantism is the major religion in Northern, Eastern and Middle Germany, with the Reformed branch predominating in the extreme northwest and Lippe, the Lutheran branch in the north and south, and the United branch in Middle and Western Germany. While the majority of Christians in Southern Germany are Roman Catholic, some areas in Baden-Württemberg and Bavaria are predominantly Protestant, e.g. Middle Franconia and the government region of Stuttgart. The vast majority of German Protestants belong to a member church of the EKD. With 20,236,000 members in 2020, around 24.3 percent of all Germans belong to a member church of the EKD. Average church attendance is lower, however, with only around a million people attending a service on Sunday.

The regional Protestant church bodies accept each other as equals, despite denominational differences. No member church runs congregations or churches in the area of another member church, thus preventing competing with each other for parishioners. The only exception is the Evangelical Reformed Church, which combines Reformed congregations within the ambits of usually Lutheran member churches, which themselves do not include the eventual local Reformed congregations. Thus, for example, a Lutheran moving from a place where their parish belongs to a Lutheran member church, would be accepted in their new place of domicile by the locally competent congregation within another member church, even if this church and its local parish are Reformed or of united Protestant confession, with Lutheran being exchangeable with the two other respective Protestant confessions within the EKD. This is due to full pulpit and altar fellowship between all EKD member churches.

In this the ambits of the member churches resemble dioceses of the Anglican or Roman Catholic churches, however, else there is no common hierarchy supervising the member churches, who are legally independent equals with the EKD being their umbrella. Members of congregations within the member churches – like those of parishes within Catholic dioceses and those enrolled in Jewish congregations also enjoying statutory corporation status – are required to pay a church tax, a surcharge on their normal income tax collected by the states of Germany and passed on to the respective religious body.

2011 census results by state

Gallery

Structure
The structure of the EKD is based on federal principles. Each regional church is responsible for Christian life in its own area while each regional church has its own special characteristics and retains its independence. The EKD carries out joint tasks with which its members have entrusted it. For the execution of these tasks, the Church has the following governing bodies, all organised and elected on democratic lines:

Synod
The Synod is the legislature of the EKD. It has 126 members: 106 elected by Landeskirchen synods and 20 appointed by the council. These 20 are appointed for their importance in the life of the Church and its agencies. Members serve six year terms and the synod meets annually.

Praesides of the Synod
 
 1949–1955: Gustav Heinemann
 1955–1961: Constantin von Dietze
 1961–1970: 
 1970–1973: Ludwig Raiser
 1973–1985: Cornelius von Heyl
 1985–2003: Jürgen Schmude
 2003–2009: Barbara Rinke
 2009–2013: Katrin Göring-Eckardt
 2013–2021: Irmgard Schwaetzer
 since 2021: Anna-Nicole Heinrich

Council of the EKD
The EKD Council is the representative and governing body of the Evangelical Church in Germany. The Council of the EKD has 15 members jointly elected by the Synod and Church Conference who serve terms of six years.

Chairman of the Council of the EKD
The representative of the EKD is the Chairman of the Council of the EKD.
 1945-1949: Theophil Wurm, Bishop, Württemberg
 1949-1961: Otto Dibelius, bishop of Berlin-Brandenburg
 1961-1967: Kurt Scharf, president, bishop from 1966, Berlin-Brandenburg
 1967-1973: , Bishop, Bavaria
 1973-1979: , Bishop, Württemberg
 1979-1985: , Bishop, Hanover
 1985-1991: , bishop of Berlin-Brandenburg
 1991-1997: , Bishop, Baden
 1997-2003: Manfred Kock, president, Rhineland
 2003-2009: Wolfgang Huber, bishop of Berlin-Brandenburg-Silesian Upper Lusatia
 2009-2010: Margot Käßmann, bishop of Hanover
 2010-2014: Nikolaus Schneider, president, Rhineland
 2014-2021: Heinrich Bedford-Strohm, Bishop, Bavaria
 2021-: Annette Kurschus, Bishop of Westphalia

Church Conference (permanent body)
The Church Conference is where member churches, through the representatives of their governing boards, can directly participate in the work of the EKD.

Church Office of the EKD
The Church Office is the administration of the EKD and shall the business of the Synod, Council and Conference of the EKD.

Main divisions:

 I = line, law and finance: President 
 II = Religious Activities and Education: Vice President  (since 2010)
 III = Public Responsibility: Vice President Horst Gorski (also head of the Office of the United Evangelical Lutheran Church of Germany) (since 2007)
 IV = ecumenism and working abroad: Vice President Bishop , foreign bishop and head of the Office of the Union of Evangelical Churches) (since 2014)

President
 1945-1948: Hans Asmussen
 1949-1965: Heinz Brunotte
 1966-1989: 
 1989-1997: Otto von Camphausen
 1997-2006: 
 2006-2010: 
 since 2010: 
The EKD Church Office has approximately 200 employees.

International activities 
The EKD holds various charities ("Hilfswerke") under its auspices.  The Gustav-Adolf-Werk (GAW) (Gustaphus Adolphus Union formerly) was founded 1832 in Leipzig as the first and eldest such organization and is responsible to aid feeble sister churches, especially in Roman Catholic countries and the Protestant diaspora. It has separate branches internationally, the organization in Austria is still called the Gustav-Adolf-Verein. Brot für die Welt is responsible for international development aid.

Member churches (since 2012)

The umbrella of the Evangelical Church in Germany comprises 20 regional churches:

11 United Protestant (Lutheran and Reformed)
7 Lutheran
2 Reformed

These bodies are termed Landeskirchen ("Regional Churches") though in most cases, their territories do not correspond to the current federal states, but rather to former duchies, electorates and provinces or mergers thereof.

Evangelical Church of Anhalt (Evangelische Landeskirche Anhalts), a united church body in Anhalt
Evangelical Church in Baden (Evangelische Landeskirche in Baden), a united church body in Baden
Evangelical Lutheran Church in Bavaria (Evangelisch-Lutherische Kirche in Bayern), a Lutheran church body in Bavaria
Evangelical Church Berlin-Brandenburg-Silesian Upper Lusatia (Evangelische Kirche in Berlin-Brandenburg-schlesische Oberlausitz), a united church body in Berlin-Brandenburg-Silesian Upper Lusatia merged in 2004 from:
 Evangelische Kirche in Berlin-Brandenburg
 Evangelische Kirche der schlesischen Oberlausitz
Evangelical Lutheran Church in Brunswick (Evangelisch-Lutherische Landeskirche in Braunschweig), a Lutheran church body in Brunswick
Evangelical Church of Bremen (Bremische Evangelische Kirche), a united church body in Bremen
Evangelical-Lutheran Church of Hanover (Evangelisch-Lutherische Landeskirche Hannovers), a Lutheran church body in the former Province of Hanover
Protestant Church in Hesse and Nassau (Evangelische Kirche in Hessen und Nassau), a united church body in the former People's State of Hesse and Nassau
Evangelical Church of Hesse Electorate-Waldeck (Evangelische Kirche von Kurhessen-Waldeck), a united church body in former Hesse-Cassel and Waldeck
Church of Lippe (Lippische Landeskirche), a Reformed church body of Lippe
Evangelical Church in Central Germany (Evangelische Kirche in Mitteldeutschland), a united church body that was created in 2009 from the merger of:
 Evangelical Church of the Church Province of Saxony (Evangelische Kirche der Kirchenprovinz Sachsen) (Province of Saxony)
 Evangelical-Lutheran Church in Thuringia (Evangelisch-Lutherische Kirche in Thüringen) (Thuringia)
Evangelical Lutheran Church in Northern Germany Evangelisch-Lutherische Kirche in Norddeutschland), a Lutheran church body that was created in 2012 from the merger of:
North Elbian Evangelical Lutheran Church (Nordelbische Evangelisch-Lutherische Kirche), a Lutheran church body in Northern Germany
Evangelical Lutheran Church of Mecklenburg (Evangelisch-Lutherische Landeskirche Mecklenburgs), a Lutheran church body in Mecklenburg
Pomeranian Evangelical Church (Pommersche Evangelische Kirche), a united church body in Pomerania
Evangelical Lutheran Church in Oldenburg (Evangelisch-Lutherische Kirche in Oldenburg), a Lutheran church body in Oldenburg
Evangelical Church of the Palatinate (Evangelische Kirche der Pfalz) or Protestantische Landeskirche, a united church body in Palatinate
Evangelical Church in the Rhineland (Evangelische Kirche im Rheinland), a united church body in the Rhineland 
Evangelical-Lutheran Church of Saxony (Evangelisch-Lutherische Landeskirche Sachsens), a Lutheran church body in Saxony 
Evangelical Lutheran Church of Schaumburg-Lippe (Evangelisch-Lutherische Landeskirche Schaumburg-Lippe), a Lutheran church body in Schaumburg-Lippe
Evangelical Church of Westphalia (Evangelische Kirche von Westfalen), a united church body in Westphalia
Evangelical Church in Württemberg (Evangelische Landeskirche in Württemberg), a Lutheran church body in Württemberg
Evangelical Reformed Church (Regional Church) Evangelisch-reformierte Kirche (Landeskirche), a Reformed church body, covering the territories of No. 3, 5, 7, 12, 16, 17, and 19

The Moravian Church ("Herrnhuter Brüdergemeine") and the Federation of Evangelical Reformed Congregations are associate members.

See also
Barmen Declaration
Evangelical Theology Student Council
German Evangelical Church Assembly
List of the largest Protestant bodies
Protestant Women in Germany
Religion in Germany
Union Evangelischer Kirchen (Union of Protestant Churches in Germany)

References

External links

 
Overview of World Religions

 
United and uniting churches
Germany
Members of the World Council of Churches
Christian organizations established in 1948
1948 establishments in Germany